The Alliance for the Future of Kosovo (AAK) is a right-wing political party in Kosovo.

Leadership
The party was formed on 29 April 2001 after having previously operated as a coalition of five parties since 2 May 2000. Founder and the current president of the party is Ramush Haradinaj. In December 2004 the parliament elected him as Prime Minister of Kosovo and he formed a coalition government with the largest party, the Democratic League of Kosovo (LDK).  He resigned as Prime Minister in March 2005 after learning that he had been indicted by the International Criminal Tribunal for the former Yugoslavia, for 37 counts of war crimes.  He received a full acquittal from the Tribunal on 3 April 2008.  He returned to Kosovo and immediately resumed his duties as president of the party.

The AAK currently has three deputy presidents: Blerim Shala, Naim Maloku and Ahmet Isufi.

The current Secretary General is Burim Ramadani and the Secretary of Organisation is Ibrahim Selmanaj.

In Parliament
At the last legislative elections held on 17 November 2007, the alliance won 9.6% of the popular vote and 10 out of 120 seats in the Assembly of Kosovo, which made it the fifth largest political force. This was a gain on the previous two legislative elections in 2001 and 2004 in which the AAK won 7.8% and 8.4% of the popular vote, respectively.

The AAK's eight current members of parliament are: Ramush Haradinaj, who is the leader of AAK, Shemsedin Dreshaj, Besnik Tahiri, Bëke Berisha, Pal Lekaj , Albena Reshitaj, Albana Bytyqi and Time Kadrijaj also serves as the AAK's member of the Assembly Presidency.

Currently they are part of the opposition team together with PDK, LDK and the Serb List

Local elections
At the municipal elections held on 17 November 2007, the AAK gained control of 3 municipalities in western Kosovo: Peja, Gjakova and Deçan.

At the municipal elections held on 15 November 2007, the party gained 8 of 37 municipalities of Kosovo.

Political position
AAK is located slightly to the right on the political spectrum. It is generally considered an Albanian nationalist party.

Party name and symbols
The party flag is red, black and white. White represents peace; red and black are the national colours of the 96% Albanian majority of Kosovo.

The choice of the party's name, Alliance for the Future of Kosovo (AAK) is explained in Ramush Haradinaj's second book. Whereas previous Kosovo party acronyms began with consonants, a vowel was chosen for AAK because it seems less harsh and more open. The word "future" was chosen to mark a break with the old communist tendency to reflect backwards upon one's history.  Finally, "alliance" was chosen because of its association with the NATO alliance which is much revered in Kosovo for its intervention in the Kosovo War of 1999, and also because of it evokes the idea of working together to achieve one's aims. The alliance was originally formed by several smaller parties:
People's Movement of Kosovo (Lëvizja Popullore e Kosovës - LPK)
Parliamentary Party of Kosovo (Partia Parlamentare e Kosovës)
Civic Alliance of Kosovo (Aleanca Qytetare e Kosovës)
National Movement for the Liberation of Kosovo (Lëvizja Kombëtare për Çlirimin e Kosovës)
Party of Albanian National Union (Partia e Unitetit Kombëtar Shqiptar)
Albanian Union of Christian Democrats (Unioni Shqiptar Demokristian)

Election results

References

2001 establishments in Kosovo
Albanian nationalism in Kosovo
Albanian nationalist parties
Conservative parties in Kosovo
National conservative parties
Political parties in Kosovo
Pro-European political parties in Kosovo